The Philippines participated at the 2014 Asian Para Games held in Incheon, South Korea from 19 to 24 October 2014.

Philippines also won 5 silver medals, 5 bronze medals and a total of 10 medals, finishing twenty third on the medal table.

Medalist

Silver

Bronze

Multiple

Medal summary

By sports

References

 

Nations at the 2014 Asian Para Games
2014
Asian Para Games